= Laundryheap =

UK-headquartered company operating an online laundry

- Company type: Privately held company
- Founded: 2014; 12 years ago in London, UK
- Founder: Deyan Dimitrov, Mayur Bommai
- Headquarters: London, United Kingdom
- Services: Laundry
- Website: Official website

Laundryheap is an English company that operates an online laundry delivery service.

== History ==
Laundryheap was founded in London in 2014 by Deyan Dimitrov & Mayur Bommai.

In 2020, the company began operating in Singapore, the United States and the Middle East.

In February 2021, the company sold additional shares to venture capitalists for £2.5 million, to pay for growth and expand its fleet of electric delivery vehicles.

Laundrapp, a UK-based competitor, was acquired by Laundryheap in April 2022 for an undisclosed sum of money.
